The Saint Mark's Church in Jamesville, New York is a Gothic Revival-style church built in 1878. It no longer functions as a church, and instead houses the Jamesville Community Museum.

The building was added to the National Register of Historic Places in 1997.

The church occupies a prominent position in the center of the hamlet of Jamesville, at the corner of E. Seneca Turnpike and Apulia Road.  The Seneca Turnpike was the first highway in the region.

References

External links

Jamesville Community Museum

Churches on the National Register of Historic Places in New York (state)
Historic American Buildings Survey in New York (state)
Carpenter Gothic church buildings in New York (state)
Churches completed in 1878
19th-century churches in the United States
Museums in Onondaga County, New York
History museums in New York (state)
DeWitt, New York
Churches in Onondaga County, New York
National Register of Historic Places in Onondaga County, New York